Mario Fraschini (24 November 1938 – 16 August 1983) was an Italian sprinter, who won two medals at the Summer Universiade with the Italy national relay team. He was born in Pizzighettone, Italy

Biography
Fraschini participated in one edition of the Summer Olympics (1960). He earned 19 caps in national team from 1958 to 1965.

Achievements

National titles
Fraschini won six national championships at the individual senior level.

Italian Athletics Championships
400 m: 1958, 1960, 1961, 1962, 1963 (5)
800 m: 1960 (5)

See also
 Italy national relay team

References

External links
 

1938 births
1983 deaths
Italian male sprinters
Athletes (track and field) at the 1960 Summer Olympics
Olympic athletes of Italy
Athletics competitors of Fiamme Oro
Universiade medalists in athletics (track and field)
Universiade silver medalists for Italy
Universiade bronze medalists for Italy
Italian Athletics Championships winners
Medalists at the 1959 Summer Universiade
Medalists at the 1963 Summer Universiade
20th-century Italian people